Windermere is a residential neighborhood in Seattle, Washington, named after Windermere in England's Lake District. It is bounded on the north by Magnuson Park, part of Sand Point; on the northwest by Sand Point Way N.E., beyond which is Hawthorne Hills; on the southwest by Ivanhoe Place N.E., beyond which is Laurelhurst; and on the southeast by Lake Washington. The area has been a part of Seattle since 1910.

The neighborhood is home to the National Archives at Seattle, which is located on Sand Point Way (State Route 513).

References

External links

Seattle City Clerk's Neighborhood Map Atlas — Windermere